Mountain Air may refer to:

Mountain Air (New Zealand), an airline based in New Zealand
Mountain Air (Nepal),  a defunct airline from Nepal
Mountain Air Cargo, a North Carolina-based cargo airline
 Mountain Air (film), a 1917 German film